IT'SNAZ is a double live album by the Scottish hard rock band Nazareth, released in September 1981.

The full album title is It's Naz but the artwork spread the title, in block-capitals, fully over the outside of the gatefold-sleeve: when not opened only 'S NAZ is visible on the front. The back of the original album cover includes the letters "I" and "T" causing many to misinterpret the title of the album as "'Snaz" which is incorrect. That no space was left between the 'S' and 'NAZ' seems deliberate, as contemporary adverts for the album in the music press write it as IT'SNAZ. The band's official website gives the title as It's Naz.

The album was recorded at the Pacific Coliseum in Vancouver, Canada, in May 1981 during the band's 1981 North American tour. The band recorded several of the dates on the tour but felt this one show was fine in its entirety. The album was mixed at The Manor, Oxfordshire.

The original LP featured two bonus studio tracks, "Juicy Lucy" and a re-recording of "Morning Dew". Together with "Crazy (A Suitable Case for Treatment)", from the Heavy Metal soundtrack, these were the first studio recordings of the new 6-piece line-up. In Germany, the LP originally came with a free bonus 1-sided 7", a remix of "Morning Dew" with the vocals sung in German, and thus titled "Morgentau". This was never issued separately, although it is sometimes (incorrectly) listed as a promo single.

Due to time-constraints, the original 1987 single-CD release dropped five tracks from the original vinyl ("Every Young Man's Dream", "Big Boy", "Let Me Be Your Leader" and the two studio cuts). The 1997 remaster by Rob Corich, on the Castle Communications / Essential label, again did not include all tracks, as the label did not consider a 2-CD set to be financially viable. However, it did restore "Let Me Be Your Leader", whilst the remaining four absent tracks were included on the 1998 reissue of The Fool Circle.

Eagle Records acquired the Nazareth back catalogue at the turn of the century, and set about reissues. In 2001 Snaz was finally transferred to CD in its entirety, being a "30th Anniversary Edition" 2CD release, including all live tracks in the correct running-order, plus the two studio tracks that finish side D of the original vinyl. A sticker on the front drew attention to the fact, reading "Original complete double album available for the first time on CD. Digitally remastered."

In 2011 Salvo Records re-released the album with additional material from a Seattle concert together with "Crazy (A Suitable Case for Treatment)" and the German version of "Morning Dew" (titled Morgentau). Salvo's CD 1 comprises sides 1-3 of the original vinyl (tracks 1-15), while CD 2 consists of side 4 of the original vinyl, expanded with bonus tracks.

Reception
In 2005, IT'SNAZ was ranked number 430 in Rock Hard magazine's book The 500 Greatest Rock & Metal Albums of All Time.

Track listing

Side 1

Side 2

Side 3

Side 4

2011 Salvo Disc 2 bonus tracks

Disc 1 of the 2011 Salvo Remaster includes Sides 1-3 of the original vinyl release. Disc 2 includes Side 4 plus the 9 bonus tracks listed above.
Morgentau and Crazy (A Suitable Case for Treatment) are also available on Salvo reissue of The Fool Circle album; Morgentau is also available on the 30th anniversary edition of The Fool Circle album.

Personnel
Nazareth
 Dan McCafferty - vocals
 Manny Charlton - guitar
 Billy Rankin - guitar, backing vocals
 John Locke - keyboards
 Pete Agnew - bass guitar, backing vocals
 Darrell Sweet - drums, backing vocals

Chart performance

References

Nazareth (band) live albums
1981 live albums
A&M Records live albums
Albums produced by John Punter